The Distant Land is a 1987 Austrian-German drama film that was adapted from the play by Arthur Schnitzler and directed by Luc Bondy. It was screened in the Un Certain Regard section at the 1987 Cannes Film Festival. The film was selected as the Austrian entry for the Best Foreign Language Film at the 61st Academy Awards, but was not accepted as a nominee.

Plot
A promising young pianist commits suicide. He spent his last evening in the company of the industrialist Friedrich Hofreiter. His wife Genia is in possession of a farewell note.

Cast
 Michel Piccoli – Friedrich Hofreiter
 Bulle Ogier – Génia
 Wolfgang Hübsch – Mauer
 Barbara Rebeschini – Erna
 Milena Vukotic – Madame Wahl
 Dominique Blanc – Adèle Natter
 Jutta Lampe – Madame Meinhold
 Alain Cuny – Aigner – le père d'Otto
 Gabriel Barylli – Otto
 Friedrich Hammel – Stanzides
 Jeff Layton – Paul
 Paulus Manker – Korsakov
 Dorothea Parton – La nurse
 Paul Burian – Monsieur Natter
 Luís Miguel Cintra

See also
 List of submissions to the 61st Academy Awards for Best Foreign Language Film
 List of Austrian submissions for the Academy Award for Best Foreign Language Film

References

External links

1987 films
1987 drama films
1980s German-language films
Austrian drama films
West German films
Austrian films based on plays
French films based on plays
German films based on plays
Films based on works by Arthur Schnitzler
Films directed by Luc Bondy
Films set in the 1900s
Adultery in films
German drama films
French drama films
1980s German films
1980s French films